Qilong may refer to:

Places in China
 Qilong Township, an exclave of Jiangsu province on Shanghai's Chongming Island
 Qilong station (Chongqing Rail Transit), a station on Line 3 of the Chongqing Metro, China
 Qilong station (Chengdu Metro), a station on Line 5 of the Chengdu Metro, China

People
 Ren Qilong (born 1959), Chinese engineer
 Tan Qilong (1913–2003), Chinese politician
 Zhang Qilong (1900–1987), Chinese politician